Sarah, Duchess of York (born Sarah Margaret Ferguson; 15 October 1959), also known by the nickname Fergie, is a member of the British royal family. She is the former wife of Prince Andrew, Duke of York, the younger brother of King Charles III.

She was raised in Dummer, Hampshire, and attended the Queen's Secretarial College. She later worked for public relations firms in London, and then for a publishing company. Ferguson began a relationship with Prince Andrew in 1985, and they were married on 23 July 1986 at Westminster Abbey. They have two daughters, the princesses Beatrice and Eugenie. Their marriage, separation in 1992, and divorce in 1996 attracted much media coverage.

Both during and after her marriage, Sarah has been involved with several charities as a patron and spokesperson. Her charity work primarily revolves around helping cancer patients and children. She has been the patron of Teenage Cancer Trust since 1990 and founded Children in Crisis and Sarah's Trust. In the years after her divorce, Sarah was the subject of scandals that affected her relationship with the royal family, but she has appeared in various royal events in recent years. She has authored several books for children and adults and has worked as a TV personality and film producer.

Early life
Sarah Margaret Ferguson was born on 15 October 1959 at London Welbeck Hospital in London. She is the second daughter of Major Ronald Ferguson (1931–2003) and Susan Barrantes (née Wright; 1937–1998). She has one older full sister, Jane. After Ferguson's parents divorced in 1974, her mother married polo player Héctor Barrantes in 1975 and moved to Trenque Lauquen in the Argentine pampas. Sarah stayed at the  Dummer Down Farm at Dummer, Hampshire, her father's home since age 8. Major Ferguson married Susan Deptford in 1976 and had three more children: Andrew, Alice, and Elizabeth. Sarah later mentioned that at the age of 12, when her parents' marriage started to fall apart, she developed an eating disorder and "turned to overeating for comfort".

Known informally as "Fergie", she once described her family as "country gentry with a bit of old money". She is a descendant of King Charles II of England via three of his illegitimate children: Charles Lennox, 1st Duke of Richmond; James Scott, 1st Duke of Monmouth; and Anne Lennard, Countess of Sussex. She has aristocratic ancestry, being the great-great-granddaughter of the 6th Duke of Buccleuch, a great-granddaughter of the 8th Viscount Powerscourt, and a descendant of the 1st Duke of Abercorn and the 4th Duke of Devonshire. Ferguson is distantly related to Prince Andrew, as they are both descended from the Duke of Devonshire as well as King James VI and I.

Ferguson attended Daneshill School, Stratfield Turgis. The staff of the school described her as a "courageous, bubbly and outgoing little girl". She then attended Hurst Lodge School in Ascot. She did not shine academically but showed talent in swimming and tennis. At a young age, she developed an interest in skiing and later briefly worked as a chalet girl. In her teenage years, she worked both as a cleaner and waitress. After finishing a course at Queen's Secretarial College at the age of eighteen, Ferguson went to work for an art gallery. Later she worked in two public relations firms in London, and then for a publishing company. Prior to marriage, she dated Kim Smith-Bingham, a stockbroker, and Paddy McNally, a motor racing manager more than 20 years her senior.

Marriage to Prince Andrew

On 19 March 1986, Prince Andrew (fourth in line to the throne at the time) and Sarah Ferguson announced their engagement. Prince Andrew had known Ferguson since childhood, and they had met occasionally at polo matches and became reacquainted with each other at Royal Ascot in 1985. Also prior to their engagement, Ferguson had accompanied Diana, Princess of Wales, during her official tour of Andrew's ship HMS Brazen. Prince Andrew designed the engagement ring himself. It consisted of ten diamonds surrounding a Burmese ruby. He chose the Burmese ruby to complement Sarah's red hair. With her fun spirit and friendly approach, she was initially considered to be a good addition to the royal family.

After securing the Queen's consent (which at that time was required by the Royal Marriages Act 1772 for all descendants of King George III), Andrew and Sarah were married in Westminster Abbey on 23 July 1986. The Queen bestowed the title Duke of York upon Prince Andrew, and, as his new wife, Sarah automatically assumed her husband's royal and ducal status and became Her Royal Highness The Duchess of York. As Duchess of York, Sarah joined her husband in carrying out royal engagements, including official overseas visits.

In 1987, the Duke and Duchess of York undertook a 25-day tour of Canada. In February 1987, Sarah got a private pilot's license and, after passing a 40-hour training course that was paid for by Lord Hanson as a wedding gift, was presented with her wings at RAF Benson in December. On 22 January 1988, during the trip to New York to attend a fundraising event, Sarah was attacked by a young man at the entrance of her hotel. The man, who was screaming "murderers 3/8" and had the Irish Republican Army flag in his hands when he rushed at Sarah, was "charged with attempted assault on the Duchess and assault on a federal agent". Later, a State Department press officer stated that "she was unharmed in the incident". In March 1988, the Duke and Duchess of York visited California. The trip was described by two British newspapers as a "brash, vulgar, excessive, weak-humored exhibition by two royals". The couple was defended by city officials of Los Angeles who stated that the criticism was "awful" and offensive, and observers described the Duke and his wife's behaviour as friendly and said that they fulfilled their duties. In May 1989, Sarah went on an official solo trip to Berlin.

The couple became parents on 8 August 1988, with the birth of their daughter Beatrice. Sarah suffered from high blood pressure and excessive water retention during her pregnancy. In September, Sarah joined her husband in Australia for an official visit. The decision to leave her newborn daughter at home in the UK while she was touring the country brought her criticism from the press and media. Their second child, another daughter, Eugenie, was born on 23 March 1990 by caesarean section. She vowed to lose weight after the birth of her first daughter. In 1989 Sarah was credited with kickstarting the UK popularity of exercise regime Callanetics after it was widely reported that founder Callan Pinckney had given her private tuition. Sarah received praise for her weight loss and some criticism for not gaining enough weight during her second pregnancy. Sarah later discussed the negative effect of the press stories about her weight on her self-esteem and added that they made her eating disorder worse.

Separation and divorce 
Biographer Sarah Bradford described how Andrew's duties as a naval officer required him to stay away from home for long periods. According to Sarah's account, the couple saw each other 40 days a year in the first five years of their marriage. By 1991, the marriage was in trouble, as Sarah was finding life as a member of the royal family increasingly difficult. Her friendship with Texan multimillionaire Steve Wyatt (son of Lynn Wyatt) gained much publicity when photographs, including one of Wyatt with Sarah's toddler daughter, appeared in newspapers in January 1992. The Duke and Duchess of York announced their separation on 19 March 1992. Following the separation, the palace announced that Sarah would no longer carry out public engagements on behalf of the Queen. Furthermore, the Queen announced in a statement that she would not take responsibility for Sarah's debts. Sarah separated her residence from her husband and moved to Romenda Lodge on the Wentworth Estate, Surrey, in 1992.

In August 1992, the British tabloid Daily Mirror published surreptitiously taken photographs of John Bryan, an American financial manager, sucking on Sarah's toes as she sunbathed topless. Sarah endured widespread public ridicule, contributing to her further estrangement from the British royal family. French magazine Paris Match was ordered to pay £84,000 in damages for publishing the photographs, though the original amount sought was £1.32 million. In 1995, Prince Andrew's aunt Princess Margaret, who had received a bouquet of flowers sent by Sarah, reportedly wrote in a letter to Sarah: "You have done more to bring shame on the family than could ever have been imagined".

After four years of official separation, the Duke and Duchess announced their mutual decision to divorce in 1996. In the years after her divorce, Sarah claimed that she had received £15,000 a year as a divorce settlement and cited her deal as a spokeswoman with Weight Watchers as her main "source of income". However, subsequent information given by senior officials to The Sunday Telegraph revealed that Sarah had received £350,000 in cash, £500,000 from the Queen to buy a new house for her and the children, and a monthly allowance that was estimated to have reached £500,000 in total by 2010. The couple shared custody of their children. In a 2007 interview, as to why they finalised their divorce she said, "I wanted to work; it's not right for a princess of the royal house to be commercial, so Andrew and I decided to make the divorce official so I could go off and get a job."

The decree nisi was granted on 17 April 1996 and the divorce was finalised on 30 May 1996, after which she legally retained the style Her Royal Highness with the style of other divorced peeresses. However, it was announced in April that Sarah had chosen not to use the style Her Royal Highness and would relinquish it under the divorce terms. In accordance with letters patent issued in August 1996 regulating post-divorce royal titles, Sarah formally ceased being a Royal Highness and was re-styled Sarah, Duchess of York.

Since her divorce, Sarah has attended some functions with her daughters, such as the investitures of the Duke of York into the Royal Victorian Order and the Order of the Garter, and Royal Ascot, and on those occasions, she is afforded the courtesy of treatment as a member of the royal family. Sarah hinted at the idea of remarrying Andrew in several interviews. In August 2013, she was invited to stay at Balmoral Castle with Prince Andrew and their daughters as guests of the Queen, and in September 2013, in response to a question about the possibility of remarrying Andrew, Sarah said, "He's still my handsome prince, he'll always be my handsome prince."

She was not invited to the 1999 wedding of Prince Edward and Sophie Rhys-Jones or the 2011 wedding of Prince William and Catherine Middleton, but she attended the wedding of Prince Harry and Meghan Markle in 2018. However, she did not receive an invitation to the evening reception at Frogmore House hosted by Prince Charles, and was reportedly "deeply upset" by her exclusion.

The Lord Chamberlain's Office has listed Sarah as a member of the royal family, along with other extended family members such as Daniel Chatto and Mike Tindall.  she is not, however, listed on a section of the royal family's website titled "Members of the Royal Family". She attended the state funeral of Queen Elizabeth II in September 2022, and was seated by her daughters' side.

Personal life after divorce

After the divorce, the British tabloids continued to cover Sarah's lifestyle. In 1995, a baggage handler at John F. Kennedy International Airport in New York City pleaded guilty to stealing her $382,000 diamond necklace and bracelet. Sarah's commercial interests have included an eleven-year endorsement with Weight Watchers and product development and promotion with Wedgwood and Avon.

Until 2004, the Duke of York and his former wife shared the family's home, Sunninghill Park in Berkshire. That year, the Duke moved to the refurbished Royal Lodge in Windsor Great Park, previously the home of his grandmother, who resided there until her death in 2002. In 2007, Sarah rented Dolphin House in Englefield Green, less than a mile from Royal Lodge; a fire at Dolphin House in 2008 caused her to vacate the premises and move into Royal Lodge with her former husband.

In 2009, Sarah participated in a much-criticised ITV "experiment" in which she joined families in a council estate to advise them on proper living.  She stayed for ten days in Northern Moor, a suburb area in Wythenshawe, Manchester, England, and the result was The Duchess on the Estate, transmitted on ITV1 on 18 August 2009. A previous, similar television venture, The Duchess in Hull, in which Sarah advised lower-income families on diet and behaviour, received similar criticism.

In 2015, Sarah was reported to have moved out of Royal Lodge and assumed residence in Verbier, Switzerland, where she and the Duke of York owned a £13 million chalet. She applied for Swiss residency in 2016. Sarah also maintains a rented apartment in Eaton Square in London and a room at Royal Lodge.

In April 2016, Sarah was named in the Panama Papers.

Debt problems
In the mid-1990s, Sarah reportedly had a £4.2 million deficit in her bank account which she paid off by going on "a four-year earning spree" in the United States.

In 2006, Sarah used the money she had earned from her career as a film producer and writer to found Hartmoor LLC in the US. A lifestyle company, it was set to help with her "career in publishing, media and public speaking". The company collapsed in 2009, leaving Sarah with a debt of £630,000. Later in the same year, it was revealed that she was in a financial dispute with three firms and in September she was summoned "to court in the UK for unpaid bills". It was reported in August 2010 that Sarah might declare voluntary bankruptcy with debts of £5 million, though other sources had suggested she owed about £2 million.

In March 2011, it was reported that Jeffrey Epstein had helped Sarah avoid bankruptcy by paying off some of her debts. The payments were reportedly made after intervention from the Duke of York. She later admitted getting money from Epstein and called it a "gigantic error". In the summer of 2011, Finding Sarah aired on the OWN network. One episode of the U.S.-filmed reality series depicted Sarah meeting with Suze Orman, the internationally known financial advisor, receiving from Orman a strict lecture and practical advice on how to resolve her financial issues.

In May 2020, it was reported that Andrew and Sarah were in a legal dispute over a debt from the 2014 purchase of their Swiss chalet. They had taken out a mortgage of £13.25 million and were expected to pay the remaining £5 million of the purchase price in cash instalments by the end of 2019; interest had increased this to £6.8 million. Despite reports that the Queen would assist them, a spokesperson for the Duke of York confirmed that she "will not be stepping in to settle the debt". The Times reported in September 2021 that Sarah and Andrew had reached a legal agreement with the property's previous owner, and would sell the house to pay back their debt. The owner agreed to receive £3.4 million, half of the amount that she was owed, as she had been under impression that Sarah and Andrew were dealing with financial troubles. In August 2022, it was reported that Sarah had purchased a £5 million townhouse in Mayfair after the success of her novel Her Heart for a Compass.

Cash for access
In May 2010, Sarah was filmed by the News of the World offering Mazher Mahmood, an undercover reporter posing as an Indian businessman, access to Prince Andrew for £500,000. On the video made as a documentary source for the story, which is publicly available, Sarah is heard to say, "£500,000 when you can, to me, open doors". She is seen taking away a briefcase containing £40,000 in cash. Exposure surrounding the incident increased Sarah's public profile and notoriety.

Sterling Publishers substantially increased the print run of Ashley Learns About Strangers, Sarah's latest book for children; however, the notoriety did not translate into additional book sales. In an interview with Oprah Winfrey, titled Oprah and Sarah Ferguson, Duchess of York, Sarah explained her behaviour by saying that she had been drinking prior to soliciting the cash, and was "in the gutter at that moment". She also claimed that her intention was initially to help a friend who "needed $38,000 (£28,000) urgently" but she ultimately asked for more money due to her own financial problems.

In November 2016, it was reported that Sarah intended to sue News Group Newspapers (parent company of the News of the World) and its owner Rupert Murdoch for £25 million in damages citing her "loss in earnings" as well as the subsequent "distress" that the media sting brought to her as the main reasons. In January 2018, it was reported that the actual amount Sarah was seeking was £45 million.

In March 2022 it was reported that the wife of jailed Turkish politician İlhan İşbilen alleged that Sarah received at least £225,000 from businessman Selman Turk, whom Mrs İşbilen is suing for fraud. An additional £25,000 was sent by Turk in October 2019 to the bank account of Sarah's younger daughter, Eugenie, the second instalment of which was referenced "birthday gift", reportedly "to pay for a surprise birthday party for the Duchess". Sarah was owed £225,000 by Pegasus Group Holdings for her role as brand ambassador, but she received the full amount from Turk, who was then set to reclaim the money from Pegasus.

2012 Turkey legal incident
On 13 January 2012, the Ministry of Justice of Turkey issued an international arrest warrant for Sarah. She had travelled to Turkey in 2008 and covertly filmed a Turkish state orphanage. The Turkish authorities alleged that Sarah made a false declaration when entering the country (in regard to her motives for visiting Turkey), trespassed into a Turkish Government institution, and also invaded the privacy of children. These charges carry sentences of up to 22 years imprisonment. Turkey and Britain have an extradition treaty; however, Home Office officials have stated:

Turkey maintains that Sarah distorted information about the orphanage and used an isolated incident in a smear campaign against the Republic of Turkey. Turkey invited international human rights organisations to inspect any orphanage of its choosing to show its transparency in relation to the issue.

On 5 May 2012, the trial began into the charges brought by the Ankara State Prosecutor's office. Cansu Şahin, representing Ferguson, who was not present, told the Ankara court that her client has apologised and would like to plea-bargain with the prosecution.

Charity work
Since her marriage to Prince Andrew, and continuing after the divorce, Sarah has been involved with a number of charities.

In 1990, Sarah became patron of the Teenage Cancer Trust. She has since opened most of the charity's various units, including those at Middlesex Hospital, University College London, St James's University Hospital, Cardiff University Hospital and Royal Marsden Hospital. Sarah began her work with people suffering from motor neurone disease in the 1990s. In her capacity as patron of the Motor Neurone Disease Association, she promoted fundraising campaigns for research about the disease and later became president of the International Alliance for ALS. To help and support those affected by drug misuse, she joined therapy sessions at the Chemical Dependency Centre and was later made their patron. In 1993, Sarah founded Children in Crisis, a children's charity focused on education and grant making to international programmes. Sarah serves as founder and life president. She founded the charity after meeting a young cancer victim named Anya during her visit to Poland in 1992.

In December 1994, Sarah went to the US to take part in a fundraising event for Peace Links and to launch her own charity, Chances for Children, in the US. Her decision to launch a fundraising event for her charity in the US was criticised by the British press, who claimed that through her Budgie the Little Helicopter series she was "expected to earn 400 million pounds over the next five years, with 3 million pounds a year going into her royal pocket" despite her promise to donate part of her earnings to charity. The claims were denied by Sarah's representative, and she later responded to the criticism by saying, "What you all must understand is that the Budgie books were produced in 1987. That's when I gave a large percentage to charity. ... And maybe after costs, after the animation is made, after everything else and the popcorn and everything else, then perhaps in five to ten years, maybe I might receive a little bit of my percentage, and that I hope will be at that time going back into Chances for Children". "Little Red", the doll that was used as a logo for her American charity, later inspired her to write a series of books named after the doll. The proceeds from selling the doll also went to Chances for Children.

In June 1998, Sarah made a brief trip to Bethesda to receive an award from the Journal of Women's Health. She also visited the National Institutes of Health (NIH) Clinical Center. NIH associate director for communications said, "The Duchess has many opportunities to talk to women via television, at lectures and through print media interviews" and was interested "in learning from NIH scientists what major health messages she should deliver to women, based on the research conducted through NIH." Sarah, whose elder daughter Beatrice was diagnosed with dyslexia at the age of seven, became a patron of Springboard for Children, a charity that helps students who struggle with reading and writing. Sarah has also described herself as "a little bit dyslexic".

In 2003, Sarah joined the American Cancer Society at a congressional briefing. She was a founding supporter of the American Cancer Society's Great American Weigh In, an annual campaign (modelled after the Society's Great American Smoke Out) aimed at raising awareness of the link between excess weight and cancer. In 2004, Sarah was named the official spokesperson of SOS Children's Villages – USA and in 2005 she became a global ambassador for Ronald McDonald House Charities. In 2006, Sarah established The Sarah Ferguson Foundation based in Toronto, which derives funds from Sarah's commercial work and private donations with the aim of supporting charities internationally that serve children and families in dire need. Included under this umbrella organisation is her patronage and support of several British charities, including Mental Disability Rights International, the African-Caribbean Leukaemia Trust, Tommy's, the Motor Neurone Disease Association, and CARE International. In 2009, it was reported that despite its income of £250,000 over 18 months, the foundation had spent only £14,200 on grants, £6,300 of which was given to the charitable arm of a South African private game reserve owned by Sir Richard Branson, a friend of Sarah's. Following the report, the foundation released a list that showed they spent around $400,000 on donations in 2008.

In 2007, Sarah joined the Advisory Council of the Ophelia Project, an American initiative aimed to support people dealing with relational and other non-physical forms of aggression. In 2008, Sarah became patron of Humanitas, a charity focused on providing children with education, healthcare and family support. In the same year, she became an ambassador for New York mayor Michael Bloomberg's anti-poverty campaign. In 2010, Sarah became a supporter of the Mullany Fund, whose aim is to support British students wishing to study medicine or physiotherapy. In 2011, Sarah became the global ambassador for Not For Sale, a charity focused on human slavery. In 2013, Sarah, along with her former husband, the Duke of York and their daughters, Princesses Beatrice and Eugenie, founded Key To Freedom, a business structure for women in vulnerable situations in India who can sell their wares through the British retailer Topshop. In 2014, Sarah was appointed an ambassador for the Institute of Global Health Innovation at Imperial College London. In 2015, Sarah revealed her connection with India and polo when she attended as a chief guest of HVR Baroda Cup in New Delhi under the invitation of Harshavardhan Reddy, chairman of HVR Sports.

In 2016, Sarah collaborated with British contemporary artist Teddy McDonald and her daughters, Princess Beatrice and Princess Eugenie, to create the first Royal contemporary painting. Titled Royal Love, it was painted on the lawn of Royal Lodge and features positive thoughts and quotes by Sarah and the princesses. The painting was exhibited in London at the Masterpiece Art Fair, Chelsea in June/July 2016 and later auctioned at private dinner. The proceeds from the sale of the painting were donated by McDonald to the charity Children in Crisis. British GQ magazine published an exclusive on the creation of the painting. In 2017, Sarah was joined by her daughter Eugenie to mark the second anniversary of the Teenage Cancer Trust unit at Alder Hey Children's Hospital. In the same year, she was named an ambassador for the British Heart Foundation.

On the 25th anniversary of Children in Crisis's foundation in 2018, Sarah said that working with this charity "gave her a sense of perspective and purpose during tough times". Sarah merged her charity foundation with Street Child, an organisation run by Tom Dannatt in Bangladesh, Afghanistan and Sierra Leone, of which Sarah has become a patron, and her daughters, Beatrice and Eugenie, are the ambassadors. Sarah is also a patron of Julia's House, a children's hospice in Corfe Mullen.

In June 2019, Sarah became the patron of Natasha Allergy Research Foundation, an organisation founded in honour of Natasha Ednan-Laperouse, who died in 2016 due to an allergic reaction after consuming a sandwich. Sarah, whose own paternal uncle died following an allergic reaction, was asked by Ednan-Laperouse's parents to become their charity's patron. The organisation is working on a bill called "Natasha's Law", which "requires all food businesses in England and Northern Ireland to list every ingredient in their pre-packaged foods". Later in July, she became an ambassador for the technology infrastructure company Pegasus Group Holdings. Sarah was chosen to initiate "the company's philanthropic endeavors" as they develop an "off-grid renewable energy data center".

In June 2020, Sarah launched her new charitable foundation called Sarah's Trust. The charity has provided aid for NHS, care home and hospice staff by delivering more than 150,000 items, including food, masks, scrubs, and toiletries. Organisations such as Under One Sky and NOAH Enterprise have helped the foundation by giving sleeping bags to homeless people in the UK. Essentials and supplies have also been sent to Ghana. In March 2022, Sarah visited Denver after being chosen as the keynote speaker at a Junior League of Denver fundraiser. In the same month, she travelled to Poland amid the 2022 Russian invasion of Ukraine to meet with Ukrainian refugees and help her charity the Sarah's Trust in organising goods donated by UK citizens. In the following month, she travelled to Albania and met Afghan refugees at a resort in Golem. In her capacity as chief ambassador of the Montessori Group, Sarah visited Croatia in June 2022 where she promoted the organisation's work on providing help for Ukrainian refugees and supporting children. In July 2022, her charity secured money to fund £14,000-worth of computers for Ukrainian refugees in Poland. She also helped with setting up the 'Play in a Box' tent in Upper Silesia to host refugee children for reading, playing, and baking. In December 2022, she hosted a choir for the blind from Kharkiv's Special Training Educational Complex during their visit to the UK, for which she was awarded with a certificate and badge from Poland's National Institute for the Blind.

Film and television career

In 2000, Sarah co-produced and served as presenter in a documentary for BBC television called In Search of the Spirit. In September 2003, she was a co-host for 3 days on BBC Radio 2's afternoon show Steve Wright. In May 2004, Sarah hosted an eleven-minute production featurette on Universal's DVD Peter Pan, titled The Legacy of Pan. Five months later, Walt Disney Feature Animation released a DVD The Cat That Looked at a King, with Sarah's voice in the role of the Queen; the story is derived from the Mary Poppins books by P. L. Travers.

In 2008, Sarah was a special correspondent to NBC's Today for which she presented segments for a series called "From the Heart". In May 2008, her two-part film The Duchess in Hull premiered on ITV1, showing Sarah helping a family on a council estate in Hull to improve their lifestyle. In the same year she travelled to Romania and Turkey for the documentary Duchess and Daughters: Their Secret Mission, shown on ITV1 on 6 November 2008, investigating poor treatment and conditions in children's institutions in those two countries. In August 2009, her documentary The Duchess on the Estate, which was about Northern Moor, Manchester, was shown on the same network. Her report on a suburb area in Manchester caused criticism for exaggerating crime in the area.

Sarah had a producing role (credited as "Sarah Ferguson") in the 2009 Jean-Marc Vallée film The Young Victoria, starring Emily Blunt and featuring a background player role for Sarah's daughter Princess Beatrice. It was Sarah who conceived the idea for a film based upon the early years of Queen Victoria. Since her marriage to Prince Andrew, she had been interested in the Queen, and had written two books about her with the help of a historian. The Victoria-Albert relationship in particular drew her into the queen's history, as she believed there were parallels between their marriage and her own with Prince Andrew, as they both "fought for their love" in the midst of public scrutiny.

Sarah had the leading role on a mini-series on Oprah Winfrey Network, titled Finding Sarah, which premiered in June 2011. She talked about her struggles through life and financial issues in the show.

In 2019, Sarah said that she was producing a TV documentary about Prince Albert's mother Princess Louise of Saxe-Gotha-Altenburg. The documentary will focus on her life, particularly her separation from her husband Ernest I, Duke of Saxe-Coburg and Gotha.

In April 2020, Sarah launched a new series on her YouTube channel, called Storytime with Fergie and Friends, in which she and a number of authors, including Nanette Newman and Imogen Edwards-Jones, read stories to children from their homes during the lockdowns due to the COVID-19 pandemic. From March to July 2021, the same channel showed 10 short episodes of Little Red News featuring characters from Ferguson's book series, Little Red.

In May 2022, she co-founded the independent production house Vestapol Films, which is based in Paris.

Notable appearances on TV and radio
 In the United Kingdom:
 She participated in the programme The Grand Knockout Tournament, informally known as It's a Royal Knockout, on 15 June 1987, in which four teams sponsored by her, the Duke of York, the Princess Royal, and Prince Edward competed for charity. The programme was criticised by the media and it was later reported that the Queen was not in favour of the event, with her courtiers having advised against it.
 Parkinson in 2003.
 The Meredith Vieira Show in 2015, discussing her former husband's alleged sex scandal.
 This Morning in 2019 to discuss "Natasha's Law".
 In the United States:
 The Oprah Winfrey Show in 1996 and 1999. In 2010, she was interviewed for a special episode on the same show, titled Oprah and Sarah Ferguson, Duchess of York, in which she discussed the "cash for access" scandal.
 In May 1998, Sarah made a cameo in the fourth-season finale of the American television sitcom Friends.
 In Australia:
 In 2013, Sarah was interviewed for an episode of Nine Network's 60 Minutes, titled "Seeing Red".

Cultural references
 The 2006 title of R&B/Hip Hop singer Stacy "Fergie" Ferguson's debut solo album, The Dutchess (dutchess is a variant spelling of duchess dating to the 17th century) was a reference to the fact that the two are associated with the same nickname. According to various media outlets, Sarah called Fergie after the release of her album and remarked: "Fergie, it's Fergie... Now that you've done this, you have to sing at a concert for my foundation, 'Children in Crisis'." Fergie agreed and committed to charity concerts in London and New York City.
 Since 2016, a fictional version of her has been portrayed by Katy Wix in the British sitcom The Windsors.
 In 2020, Sarah was portrayed briefly by English actress Jessica Aquilina in the fourth season of Netflix's The Crown.

Titles, styles, honours and arms

Titles and styles

During her marriage Sarah was styled "Her Royal Highness the Duchess of York". On 21 August 1996, letters patent declared that former wives of British princes, other than widows who did not remarry, were not entitled to the style of Her Royal Highness. Meanwhile, divorced peeresses (such as duchesses) cannot "claim the privileges or status of Peeresses which they derived from their husbands", but may continue to use the peeress title. The Royal Household refers to Sarah as "Sarah, Duchess of York", but on at least two occasions (the announcements of the engagements of her daughters), she has been referred to together with her former husband as "The Duke and Duchess of York".

Honours

Academic honours
 1991–1995: University of Salford, Chancellor
 2016: University of Huddersfield, Visiting Professor of Philanthropreneurship

Other honours and awards
 On 23 February 1987, alongside her then husband, she received the Freedom of the City of York.
 The rose cultivar Rosa 'Duchess of York' was named in her honour in 1994.
 In 1998, Sarah received the Journal of Women's Health Award from Bernadine Healy.
 In 2001, she received Redbook magazine's "Mothers & Shakers" Award.
 In 2004, she received Woman's Day magazine's "Women Who Inspire Us" Award.
 In February 2007, she was named Mother of the Year by the American Cancer Society.
 In 2007, she received the ONE X ONE Difference Award for humanitarian work benefiting children worldwide, presented at the Toronto Film Festival.
 In June 2018, she received the Humanitarian Award at the Filming Italy Sardegna Festival for her work with Children in Crisis.
 In June 2019, she received the Inspiration of the Year Award at Hello!s Star Women Awards for her work with charity organisations, including Street Child.
 In July 2022, she received the Global Humanitarian award at the 25th Magna Grecia Awards.

Arms

Issue

Bibliography

Books 
 Autobiographies and memoirs:
 1997, My Story 
 2011, Finding Sarah: A Duchess's Journey to Find Herself 
 Budgie the Little Helicopter books and 1994 animated children's television series:
 1989, Budgie the Little Helicopter 
 1989, Budgie at Bendick's Point 
 1991, Budgie and the Blizzard 
 1992, The Adventures of Budgie 
 1995, Budgie Books – S and S USA 
 1996, Budgie Goes to Sea 
 2021, Budgie the Helicopter Rescues Kubbie the Koala
 About Queen Victoria:
 1991, Victoria and Albert: A Family Life at Osborne House 
 1993, Travels with Queen Victoria 
 For young girls:
 1996, The Royal Switch 
 1997, Bright Lights 
 Lifestyle books with Weight Watchers:
 1998, Dieting with The Duchess 
 1999, Dining with The Duchess 
 2000, Win the Weight Game 
 2001, Reinventing Yourself with the Duchess of York 
 2002, Energy Breakthrough: Jump-start Your Weight Loss and Feel Great 
 2009, foreword in Weight Watchers Start Living, Start Losing: Inspirational Stories That Will Motivate You Now 
 Little Red series:
 2003, Little Red 
 2004, Little Red's Christmas Story 
 2006, Little Red's Summer Adventure 
 2009, Little Red to the Rescue 
 2009, Little Red's Autumn Adventure 
 Helping Hands series:
 2007, Charlie and the Bullies 
 2007, Harry Starts to Enjoy His Food 
 2007, Get Well Soon, Adam 
 2007, Lauren's Moving Day 
 2007, Healthy Food for Dylan 
 2007, Sophie Makes Friends 
 2007, Dalia Says Goodbye to Grandpa 
 2007, Simon Gets Better 
 2007, Emily Mover Home 
 2010, Ashley Learns about Strangers 
 2010, Emily's First Day of School 
 2010, Michael and His New Baby Brother 
 2010, Matthew and the Bullies 
 2011, When Katie's Parents Separated 
 2011, Zach Gets Some Exercise 
 2011, Jacob Goes to the Doctor and Sophie Visits the Dentist 
 2011, Molly Makes Friends 
 2011, Olivia Says Goodbye to Grandpa 
 2019, James and the Bullies 
 2020, Holly's First Day at School 
 2020, Daisy Learns about Strangers 
 Genie Gems series:
 2020, Genie Gems: Mission to Devon 
 2020, Genie Gems Meets Arthur Fantastic 
 Puddle Boots series:
 2021, Puddle Boots 
 2021, Puddle Boots Christmas 
 About Margaret and Mary Montagu Douglas Scott:
 2021, Her Heart for a Compass 
 2023, A Most Intriguing Lady 
 The Southport series:
 2022, Demon's Land 
 1988, A Guard Within 
 1989, Skiing from the Inside: The Self-help Guide to Mastering the Slopes 
 2003, What I Know Now: Simple Lessons Learned the Hard Way 
 2003, Moments 
 2008, Tea for Ruby 
 2008, Hartmoor 
 2012, Ballerina Rosie 
 2020, The Enchanted Oak Tree 
 2020, A Gift of Kindness
 2021, The Adventures of Charlie, Blue and Larry Lamp Post 
 2021, What's Under Your Hat, Granny?

Authored articles

References

External links

 
 
 

1959 births
Living people
20th-century English memoirists
21st-century English memoirists
20th-century English women writers
21st-century English women writers
Writers from London
British duchesses by marriage
British people of American descent
British royal memoirists
British women aviators
Chancellors of the University of Salford
Sarah
English Anglicans
English autobiographers
English children's writers
English film producers
Helicopter pilots
Sarah
Sarah
Participants in American reality television series
People educated at Hurst Lodge School
People from Dummer, Hampshire
People from Marylebone
People from Sunninghill
People named in the Panama Papers
Sarah
Wives of British princes